Tim Amitrano (born 27 May 1979) is an Australian equestrian. He competed in the individual jumping event at the 2004 Summer Olympics.

References

External links
 

1979 births
Living people
Australian male equestrians
Olympic equestrians of Australia
Equestrians at the 2004 Summer Olympics
People from Swan Hill